The Armstrong Siddeley Serval was a British ten-cylinder aero engine developed by Armstrong Siddeley in the late 1920s. Following company tradition, the engine was named for the serval.

Design and development
The Serval was a ten-cylinder, double-row, air-cooled radial piston engine.  It was developed from the Armstrong Siddeley Mongoose and was, more or less, two Mongooses built around a single crankcase. In fact, it first appeared as the Double Mongoose in May 1928.

Built in several variants, power output was about 340 hp (254 kW).

Variants
Serval I initially Double Mongoose
(1931) 340 hp.
Serval III
(1932) 
Serval IIIB
(1932) 310 hp.
Serval IV
 310 hp.
Serval V
(1933) 340 hp.

Applications

Airco DH.9
Armstrong Whitworth Atalanta
BFW M.36
Canadian Vickers Vancouver
Fairey Fox
ICAR Comercial
Saro Cloud
Stampe et Vertongen SV.5 Tornado

Specifications (Serval I)

See also

References

Notes

Bibliography

 Gunston, Bill. World Encyclopedia of Aero Engines. Cambridge, England. Patrick Stephens Limited, 1989. 
 Lumsden, Alec. British Piston Engines and their Aircraft. Marlborough, Wiltshire: Airlife Publishing, 2003. .

1920s aircraft piston engines
Aircraft air-cooled radial piston engines
Serval